XEW-TDT (channel 2) is a television station in Mexico City, Mexico. The station is owned by Grupo Televisa and is the flagship station to the Las Estrellas network. XEW is the second-oldest Televisa station and Mexico City's second-oldest station, founded in 1951.

History

XEW-TV came on air March 21, 1951. It was the second television station to come to air in Mexico and built on the tradition of the successful and influential XEW-AM 900. The concession was and remains held by Televimex, S.A. de C.V. The first transmission was a baseball game from Delta Park. The station came on air with its studios, known as Televicentro, still under development; these did not open formally until January 1952.

It was not until 1982 that XEW, now the keystone of a national network, took on the name Canal de las Estrellas (Channel of the Stars). In 2016, the name was shortened to Las Estrellas as part of a branding refresh.

Technical information

Digital subchannels 
The station's digital channel carries one program stream:

Analog-to-digital conversion
XEW-TV, alongside other television stations in Mexico City, discontinued regular programming on its analog signal, over VHF channel 2, at 12:00 a.m. on December 17, 2015, as part of the federally mandated transition from analog to digital television.

In 2016, in order to facilitate the repacking of TV services out of the 600 MHz band (channels 38-51), XEW was allowed to move from channel 48 to channel 32. The change occurred in April 2017, including a brief period in which both facilities operated at the same time.

Repeaters
XEW-TDT maintains two of its own repeaters that account for terrain masking and gaps in coverage within the licensed coverage area:

|-

|-

|}

Logos

External links
Official site

References

Las Estrellas transmitters
Television stations in Mexico City
Television channels and stations established in 1951
Spanish-language television stations in Mexico
1951 establishments in Mexico

es:XEW-TV
hu:XEW-TV
pt:XEW-TV
sv:Las Estrellas